The Grotto is a concrete sculpture by Carlos Cortés, along the San Antonio River in San Antonio, Texas, United States. In 2020, some pieces intended to be added to The Grotto were stolen.

References

External links
 The Grotto at San Antonio River Foundation

Buildings and structures in San Antonio
Concrete sculptures in the United States
Outdoor sculptures in San Antonio